Seongdong-dong may refer to:

Seongdong-dong, Gyeongju
Seongdong-dong, Sangju